Winterton Ness is an area of foreland on the North Norfolk coast of England.

Technically it is a narrow cuspate foreland with a high obtuse angle between its two shorelines. A number of studies appear inconclusive as to the nature of erosion or, conversely, accretion of sediment in the area.

The area was described by Daniel Defoe during the first of his trips for his account A Tour thro' the Whole Island of Great Britain.

References 

Landforms of Norfolk
Coastal features of Norfolk